Coarnele Caprei is a commune in Iași County, Western Moldavia, Romania. It is composed of three villages: Arama, Coarnele Caprei and Petroșica.

References

Communes in Iași County
Localities in Western Moldavia